Marc Mundell (born 7 July 1983, in Pietermaritzburg) is a South African race walker. He competed in the 50 kilometres walk event at the 2012 Summer Olympics finishing 32nd overall with a time of 3:55:32. This is the new African record.

He competed in the 50 km walk at the 2020 Summer Olympics.

Competition record

References

 

Sportspeople from Pietermaritzburg
South African male racewalkers
1983 births
Living people
Olympic athletes of South Africa
Athletes (track and field) at the 2012 Summer Olympics
Athletes (track and field) at the 2016 Summer Olympics
World Athletics Championships athletes for South Africa
White South African people
Athletes (track and field) at the 2007 All-Africa Games
African Games competitors for South Africa
Athletes (track and field) at the 2020 Summer Olympics
20th-century South African people
21st-century South African people